Sohna Assembly constituency is one of the 90 Legislative Assembly constituencies of Haryana state in India.

It is part of Gurgaon district.

Members of the Legislative Assembly

Election results

2019

See also
 List of constituencies of the Haryana Legislative Assembly
 Gurgaon district

References

Gurgaon district
Assembly constituencies of Haryana